The Río San Rodrigo is a stream in the state of Coahuila, Mexico, and is a tributary of the Rio Grande.

The Rio San Rodrigo originates in the Sierra del Burro, a northern finger of the Sierra Madre Oriental, and flows generally east to the Rio Grande. La Fragua Dam impounds the river at about river kilometer 20, creating La Fragua Reservoir. The dam began operations in 1991.

History
In 1849 a group of Seminoles migrated from Indian Territory to Mexico to establish a military colony. Led by Wild Cat, a noted Seminole chief, and John Horse (Gopher John), the leader of the Black Seminoles, the group consisted of about one hundred Seminoles and one hundred Black Seminoles. About five hundred Kickapoos from Missouri joined Wild Cat's group on the Rio Grande at Eagle Pass. In July, 1850, the group was admitted to Mexico. The citizens of Remolino, nearby, were not pleased and complained to the provisional government in Coahuila, which issued a decree saying that other lands would be found upon which the Indians could be settled. Nevertheless, some of the Indians did eventually settle near Remolino.

See also
 List of rivers of Mexico
 List of tributaries of the Rio Grande

References

Rivers of Coahuila
Tributaries of the Rio Grande